Mokhtarabad (also Romanized as Mokhtārābād) is a village in Gharbi Rural District, in the Central District of Ardabil County, Ardabil Province, Iran. At the 2006 census, its population was 35, in 6 families.

References 

Towns and villages in Ardabil County